The Afram Plains South constituency is in the Eastern region of Ghana. The current member of Parliament for the constituency is Hon. Eric Osei Owusu   He was elected  on the ticket of the National Democratic Congress and  won a majority of 11,186 votes representing 53.57%, to win the constituency election to become the MP. He was the CEO of National Food Buffer Stock Company, 2010–2016.

See also
List of Ghana Parliament constituencies

References

Parliamentary constituencies in the Eastern Region (Ghana)